Albert Edward Pryke "Ted" Briggs  (1 March 1923 – 4 October 2008) was a British seaman and the last of the three survivors of the destruction of the battlecruiser . He remained in the Royal Navy after the Second World War and was later commissioned, serving a total of 35 years in the Royal Navy by the time of his retirement in 1973.

Biography
Born 1 March 1923 in Redcar, North Riding of Yorkshire, Briggs first saw Hood at anchor off the River Tees when he was 12, and volunteered to join the Royal Navy the following day. He was told he would have to wait until he was 15, so it was on 7 March 1938, one week after his 15th birthday, that he finally joined the navy. After his training he was delighted to be assigned to HMS Hood which he joined on 29 July 1939. He initially served as an officers' messenger.

Soon after the Second World War began, Hood was assigned to patrol and escort duty in the North Atlantic and also served as part of Force H in the Mediterranean Sea. The German ship was 20 years newer and slightly larger than Hood. She had modern main armament and superior armour. The battle-cruiser encountered Bismarck and engaged her at long range. Bismarck returned fire and destroyed Hood, killing all aboard except for Briggs and two others. The Battle of the Denmark Strait and the loss of the Hood were regarded by the British public as one of the greatest disasters to befall the Royal Navy during the war. Prince of Wales survived, only to be sunk by Japanese bombers in December 1941.

Ted Briggs, on the compass platform near the bridge, recalled not hearing the initial explosion, but only a huge sheet of flame that shot around Hoods compass platform, followed by a heavy list. When the list reached 30 degrees Briggs realised that "she was not coming back". As Briggs and the remaining crew on the compass platform struggled to escape, Briggs remembered "The flag Lieutenant who was just in front of me stood to one side to let me go through ... I'll never forget that." He also could remember how the compass master had stood on the platform "tall and fearless" as the water pulled him down. Briggs himself attempted to swim away from the vessel but was pulled under by her as she started toward the ocean bottom. Briggs remembers struggling to stay afloat, giving up hope, and then miraculously being propelled to the surface. This was probably the result of air escaping from the ship, possibly the bridge windows collapsing and releasing trapped air, or a boiler explosion. That image would haunt me in nightmares for the next 40 years. When I swam clear of the ship, seconds later I turned back, she was gone".

After the Hood sank, Briggs got aboard a raft from the ship and saw only two other survivors, Bob Tilburn and Bill Dundas, who boarded some rafts as well. Briggs paddled his raft to the other two survivors and stayed by their sides, holding their hands and singing popular British songs to keep them conscious.

The three were the only survivors of the sinking; 1,415 were confirmed lost. In both publications and recorded interviews, he refers to the sacrifice made by the squadron's navigating officer Commander John Warrand, who stood aside and allowed him to exit the compass platform first. Briggs also confirms that the squadron commanding officer, Vice Admiral Lancelot Holland, was last seen still sitting in his admiral's chair, in utter dejection. He was making no attempt to escape the ship as she sank.

Hilary served as a Combined Operations Headquarters ship, at Salerno and had the same role during the D-Day landings. Later he served aboard HMS Mercury as a fleetwork instructor. Briggs was promoted first to leading signalman in March 1942, and then yeoman of signals in March 1943. Briggs remained in the Royal Navy after the end of the war, became an officer, and served until 1973 in a variety of capacities.

Briggs retired on 2 February 1973, with the rank of lieutenant, settled in the south of England and worked in Fareham as a furnished lettings manager. In the year he retired, at the Queen's Birthday Honours he was appointed a Member of the Order of the British Empire. In 1975, Briggs joined the HMS Hood Association as one of its youngest members and was elected as its first President. In 1995, Briggs again served as president of the organisation.

Briggs regularly told his story as a guest-speaker, lecturer, and subject of historical television and radio documentaries. In July 2001, Briggs visited the wreck site and released a plaque which commemorates the lost crew of the Hood. He was co-author of a book on the subject, titled Flagship "Hood": The Fate of Britain's Mightiest Warship. Briggs recorded an oral history with the Imperial War Museum, which is available on its website.

Ted Briggs died in the Queen Alexandra Hospital, Portsmouth, on 4 October 2008 at the age of 85.

Military service 

 July 1939 – May 1941: 
 1941 to possibly 1943: shore establishments  and 
 1943–1944: , including Salerno and Normandy
 October 1945:  – Palestine patrols
 April 1948: HMS Mercury as fleetwork instructor
 February 1949:  – 2nd Submarine Squadron
 October 1949: HMS Mercury – cryptographic instructor
 February 1950:  – Korean War
 July 1952: HMS Mercury – signal instructors course
 January 1953: rated as chief yeoman of signals served at CinC EASTLANT (Commander-in-Chief, Eastern Atlantic Area, NATO) Communications Centre
 November 1953:  and  training squadron as training chief yeoman
 December 1955: commissioned officer. HMS Mercury – commissioned communication officer course
 July 1956: promoted to commissioned communication officer
 September 1956:  as a signals officer – Suez Crisis
 May 1958: HMS Mercury
 January 1959:  (Londonderry) as assistant base communications officer
 December 1960: HMS Mercury – new entry training officer
 April 1961: promoted to lieutenant
 June 1964: Whitehall Wireless Station as rating control officer
 October 1966:  as communications officer
 June 1969: HMNB Devonport as officer in charge of the Signal Training Centre
 January 1971:  (Whale Island) as officer in charge of the Leading Rates Leadership School

Decorations and medals 
In addition to being appointed a Member of the Order of the British Empire, Lieutenant Briggs's medals included the 1939–1945 Star, Atlantic Star with "France and Germany" clasp, Italy Star, War Medal 1939–1945 with mention-in-dispatches device, Naval General Service Medal with "Palestine 1945–48" and "Near East" clasps, Korea Medal, United Nations Korea Medal, General Service Medal with "Borneo" clasp, and Naval Long Service and Good Conduct Medal.

References

External links 
 HMS Hood Association
 Imperial War Museum Interview

1923 births
2008 deaths
Military personnel from Yorkshire
Members of the Order of the British Empire
People from Redcar
Royal Navy officers
Royal Navy personnel of the Korean War
Royal Navy personnel of World War II
British military personnel of the Suez Crisis